Kenichi Yatsuhashi (Japanese: 八橋健一 Kyrgyz: Кеничи Ясухаши,  born 6 February1969 in Japan) is a Japanese football manager who currently manages football club Angthong in the Thai League 3 Western region.

Career

College and youth coaching career

Arriving at New York City in December 1988, he began coaching youth soccer teams: the Elmont Ravens girls' team, the Brooklyn Patriots boys' team, and  the Gotham Girls Chargers team.  Next, Yatsuhashi became coach of the BMCC men's soccer team where he served as the women's coach for 9 years and guided them to the NJCAA Division III nationals in 2004 and won third place plus six conference championships.  Just after that, he was chosen coach of the City University of New York Athletic Conference All-Star team which competed in the Goodwill South African Tour. 
 
His original reason for going to the United States was to study art. At one point, he could have become an American citizen, but the paperwork and application fees amounted to over US$1000 so he decided not to apply and has now expressed penitence for passing on the opportunity.

Africa and Asia

In 2012, Kenichi moved to Kyrgyzstan where he served as the  Kyrgyzstan Football Federation technical director and Kyrgyzstan U16 coach.  He has guided them during U16 AFC Qualifications and recorded 3–3 draw against Oman and lost to Qatar by 3–4. 
 
Almost immediately, he was criticized on account of his inexperience coaching professional teams. Eventually, he was fired as coach in June 2016 despite winning his first two games in charge and leading his team at the top or 2nd of the table. With Hearts of Oak, he was known for making his team score mostly second-half goals. In addition to this, the club had a record of being unbeaten in 7 away games under Kenichi. 
Meanwhile, he had refuted claims that his team's good form was because of impermissible drugs, claiming  that it was a result of hard work and training. 
 
Kenichi has ruled out a possible return to Hearts of Oak amidst speculation. 
 
Ifeanyi Ubah F.C. discharged him of his duties in 2016. Thereupon, he was appointed coach of Cambodian Tiger FC in the C-League in February 2017. 
 
Only three months after his arrival in 2017, Cambodian Tiger FC parted away with Kenichi; he has expressed desire to return to coaching in Ghana and has hinted at a move to Asante Kotoko.
On 28 December 2019, he was appointed coach of Lonestar Kashmir in the I-League 2nd division.

Personal life

Living in New York City for 23 years, he sees it as his home even though he is ethnically Japanese.

Licenses and certifications

NSCAA Coach of the Year Award
AFC Pro License
USSF "A" License
USSF National Youth License
CONCACAF International Coaching License
FIFA Goalkeeping License
NSCAA Goalkeeping Diploma

References

Japanese football managers
Expatriate football managers in Qatar
Expatriate football managers in Kyrgyzstan
Expatriate football managers in Cambodia
Expatriate football managers in Nigeria
Expatriate soccer managers in the United States
Japanese expatriate football managers
Expatriate football managers in Ghana
1970 births
Living people
Aspire Academy managers
Accra Hearts of Oak S.C. managers
Angkor Tiger FC managers
Ghana Premier League managers
Expatriate football managers in Sri Lanka
Kenichi Yatsuhashi
Japanese expatriate sportspeople in Sri Lanka